The Lillian Carter Center for International Nursing is an organizational unit of Emory University named after Lillian Gordy Carter, President Jimmy Carter's mother, in honor of her humanitarian work in India. It was established in 2001.

History
In 2001, the organization was established and dedicated to Lillian Gordy Carter. The organization has been involved with the Georgia Tech Research Institute and the Kenya Health Work Force Project in automating health information systems in Kenya and Zimbabwe.

References

External links
 Official website

Emory University
2001 establishments in Georgia (U.S. state)
Organizations established in 2001